The 1886 Amherst football team represented the Amherst University during the 1886 college football season.

Schedule

References

Amherst
Amherst Mammoths football seasons
Amherst football